Daniel Dominik Kaiser-Küblböck (born Küblböck; 27 August 1985 – 9 September 2018) was a German pop singer. He placed third in the television talent show Deutschland sucht den Superstar in 2003. 

In September 2018, he went missing at sea off Canada while travelling on a cruise ship. He was declared dead on 10 March 2021. Shortly before the disappearance, Küblböck stated he wanted to live a female identity and began using the name Lana Kaiser.

Early life
Küblböck had four siblings and was of German and Italian descent. He completed secondary school ("Hauptschule") in 2001.

Career 

Küblböck rose to stardom in late 2002 when he participated in the first season of Deutschland sucht den Superstar (DSDS). He gained the most viewer votes in three of the nine rounds of the competition and received the second-most votes in a further three rounds. He finished the season in third place overall.

After DSDS, Küblböck signed a contract with BMG. By June 2004, he had released four singles and one album. In August 2004, the film Daniel – Der Zauberer (Daniel the Wizard) was released which starred Küblböck as a fictionalized version of himself. The film was critically panned and bombed at the box office.

In 2005, Küblböck appeared in the sixth season of the German version of Big Brother, and in 2015, he took part in the eighth season of the German version of Let's Dance, where he finished sixth, together with his dancing partner Otlile Mabuse. In 2013, Küblböck wanted to participate in the German national final for the 2014 Eurovision Song Contest with his new song Be a Man, but was rejected by the jury.

Küblböck invested the proceeds from his album Positive Energie amounting to around one million euros in a solar plant in Lower Bavaria, which brought him high profits. In September 2003, he launched a perfume line for children in three fragrances under his name.

Personal life
On 24 February 2004, Küblböck was injured when he collided with a truck while driving a car without a licence. He was fined €25,000 and sentenced to eight hours of community service.

In 2010, Küblböck came out as gay, after previously describing himself as bisexual.

His older brother Michael, who was described as a neo-Nazi in German tabloids, died on 3 January 2013 in Berlin due to a heroin overdose.

2018 disappearance
Küblböck was a private passenger on the cruise ship AIDAluna that left Hamburg on 29 August 2018, bound for New York City. At around 5 a.m. (local time) on 9 September, he jumped overboard. The vessel was in open waters about 185 km north of St. John's in the Labrador Sea.

The Canadian Coast Guard launched a search operation, assisted by the cruise ships AIDAluna and MS Zuiderdam. On 10 September, the search was abandoned, because the maximum survival time in cold water was exceeded. Under German law, a person missing at sea can be declared dead after six months have elapsed and a motion is filed by an eligible party. In August 2020 an application was submitted to declare Küblböck dead or to present evidence by 30 September 2020 that he is alive. On 10 March 2021, the Amtsgericht (district court) Passau declared Küblböck dead, setting his death date as 9 September 2018, 8:55 a.m. local time.

Gender identity / Lana Kaiser 
Before the disappearance, Küblböck talked about wanting to live out a female identity. The self-chosen name was "Lana Kaiser". Several posts were published on social media in which Küblböck announced that he "would have surgery as a woman" and also said that his hormone therapy had already started. Shortly before the disappearance, Küblböck created an Instagram account with the name rosa_luxem, on which hashtags such as #transformation, #transexuelle or #womenarestrong were used.

In 2020, the artist Philipp Gufler created a 13-minute short film and a magazine about Lana Kaiser. The film was shown among others at the 67th Short Film Festival in Oberhausen and in the group exhibition Sweat in the Haus der Kunst, Munich.

Discography

Albums

Singles

DVDs
 My Life Is Magic (2004)
 Live on PE Tour 2003 (2004)
 Jazz Night (2007)
 Back to the Roots (2008)
 Jazz Meets Blues... wenn zwei sich verlieben (2009)
 Schrebergarten Berlin (2011)
 Diez años Kúblbóck – Ich versteh' nur Spanisch – Live (2013)

 As member of DSDS All-Stars – season 1 

As member of 4 United
(project with Gracia Baur, Nektarios Bamiatzis and Stephanie Bruckmeyer)

 Filmography 
Films

 Daniel - Der Zauberer (starring)
 Crazy Race II (minor role)

TV series

 St. Angela (guest appearance)
 2004: I'm a Celebrity...Get Me Out of Here!Bibliography
 Küblböck, Daniel in collaboration with Julia Boenisch (2003). Ich lebe meine Töne. Munich: Random House, 223 pages. .
 Küblböck, Daniel (2007). Daniel Küblböck - My Way: Konzertbildband August 2005 bis Dezember 2006''. Positive Energie GmbH, 103 pages.

See also
List of people who disappeared mysteriously at sea

References

External links 

 Official website
 
 

1985 births
2010s missing person cases
Bisexual men
Bisexual singers
Deutschland sucht den Superstar participants
Ich bin ein Star – Holt mich hier raus! participants
English-language singers from Germany
German autobiographers
German male singers
German people of Italian descent
German pop singers
Missing people
Missing person cases in Canada
German LGBT singers
People from Passau (district)
People lost at sea
People declared dead in absentia
20th-century LGBT people
21st-century LGBT people